Indotyphlops ahsanai is a species of snake in the family Typhlopidae. The species is endemic to Pakistan. Not further Study available about this species. Because their number is almost non-existent and their picture has not been recorded yet۔

Etymology
The specific name, ahsanai, is in honor of Pakistani zoologist Ahsanul-Islam (1927–1974).

Geographic range
I. ahsanai is found in the province of Punjab, Pakistan.

References

Further reading
Hedges SB, Marion AB, Lipp KM, Marin J, Vidal N (2014). "A taxonomic framework for typhlopid snakes from the Caribbean and other regions (Reptilia, Squamata)". Caribbean Herpetology (49): 1-61. (Indotyphlops ahsanai, new combination).
Khan MS (1999). "Two new species of blind snakes genus Typhlops from Azad Kashmir and Punjab, Pakistan (Serpentes: Typhlopidae)". Russian Journal of Herpetology 6 (3): 231–240. (Typhlops ahsanai, new species, p. 238).

ahsanai
Reptiles described in 1999